Antonio Lanzavecchia (born in Varese October 9, 1951) is an Italian and Swiss immunologist. As a fellow of Collegio Borromeo he obtained a degree with honors in Medicine in 1976 from the University of Pavia where he specialized in Pediatrics and Infectious Diseases. He is Head Human Immunology Program, Istituto Nazionale di Genetica Molecolare-INGM, Milan and SVP Senior research Fellow, Humabs/Vir Biotechnology, Bellinzona and San Francisco (USA). Since 2017, he is also Professor at the Faculty of Biomedical Sciences of the Università della Svizzera italiana (USI).

Career
Since 1980 Lanzavecchia's laboratory developed robust methods to study human T and B cells in vitro, first at the University of Genoa, then at the Basel Institute for Immunology and, from 1999 to 2020 at the Institute for Research in Biomedicine in Bellinzona, of which he was the founding Director. He has been teaching Immunology at the University of Genoa and the University of Siena and from 2009 to 2017 has been Professor of Human Immunology at the Swiss Federal Institute of Technology Zurich. Following Google Scholar, Lanzavecchia has an h-index of 154.

Research
Starting in the early Eighties, Lanzavecchia has contributed to the advancement of human immunology in three distinct fields: i) antigen presentation and dendritic cell biology; ii) lymphocyte activation and immunological memory and iii) human monoclonal antibodies. In 1985, using antigen-specific T and B cell clones, Lanzavecchia demonstrated that B cells efficiently capture, process and present antigen to T helper cells. This study uncovered a critical step in the process of T-B cell cooperation that is essential for high affinity antibody production and is the basis for the development of glycoconjugate vaccines. 

He also studied the role of HLA class II molecules as receptors for self, versus foreign peptides and the role of inflammatory stimuli in promoting antigen presentation by antigen-presenting cells. 

In 1994 Sallusto and Lanzavecchia discovered that human monocytes could be induced to differentiate in vitro into immature dendritic cells that resemble those that function as sentinels in peripheral tissues, contributing to the rapid advancement of the field in the late nineties. Taking advantage of such immature dendritic cells, they characterized in detail the maturation process and identified the microbial and endogenous stimuli that trigger dendritic cell maturation. 

In the late Nineties the Lanzavecchia laboratory determined the mechanism, stoichiometry and kinetics of T cell receptor stimulation and signaling and discovered a fundamental division of memory T cells into two major subsets of central memory and effector memory and central T cells that play distinct roles in immediate protection and secondary immune responses. 

Starting in 2003, the laboratory developed efficient methods to isolate human monoclonal antibodies as new tools for prophylaxis and therapy of infectious diseases. Among these is FI6 that neutralizes all influenza A viruses, MPE8 that neutralizes four different paramyxoviruses and mab114 (Ansuvimab) that has been approved for treatment of Ebola infected patients. 

The laboratory also pioneered the use of human monoclonal antibodies as tools for vaccine design, a process dubbed as “analytic vaccinology”. Basic studies addressed the role of somatic mutations in the development of broadly neutralizing antibodies and the relationship between infection and autoimmunity. The study of the antibody response to the malaria parasite led to the discovery of a new mechanism of antibody diversification through the insertion into antibody genes of DNA encoding pathogen receptors such as LAIR1.

In 2021, Lanzavecchia and colleagues developed a vaccine that protects animals from Salmonella.

Awards
 EMBO Gold Medal, 1988
 Cloëtta Prize, 1999
 Order of Merit of the Italian Republic, Cavaliere della Repubblica, 2001
 Premio Ercole Pisello, 2014
 Robert Koch Medal and Award, Prize, 2017
 Sanofi-Institut Pasteur Award, 2017
 Louis-Jeantet Prize for Medicine, 2018
 ERC-AdG grants: IMMUNExplore 2010–15, BROADimmune 2015–20, ENGRAB 2020–2025
 Ernst Jung Gold Medal for Medicine 2021

Honors 
 European Molecular Biology Organisation (EMBO)
 The Henry Kunkel Society
 Royal College of Physicians
 Swiss Society for Allergology and Immunology (SSAI), honorary member
 American Society for Immunology (AAI), honorary member
 Swiss Academy of Medical Sciences, honorary member
 U.S. National Academy of Sciences, International member

Editorial activities
 Science: board of reviewing editors 1997–2005
 European Journal of Immunology: executive committee member
 Journal of Experimental Medicine: advisory editor

Selected Patents
 Monoclonal antibody production by EBV transformation of B cells (WO2004076677)
 Human cytomegalovirus neutralizing antibodies and use thereof (WO2008084410)
 Neutralizing anti-influenza virus antibodies and uses thereof (WO2010010467)
 Methods for producing antibodies from plasma cells (WO2010046775)

Selected publications
Lanzavecchia has a total of 355 publications in peer reviewed scientific journals, with a total of over 108,200 citations (h-index=146). A complete list can be found on Google Scholar.

References

1951 births
Living people
Italian biologists
Italian immunologists
University of Pavia alumni
Academic staff of the University of Siena
Foreign associates of the National Academy of Sciences
Academic staff of ETH Zurich